Anthaster valvulatus is a species of sea stars in the family Orestieridae. It is the sole species in the genus Anthaster. While its common name is the brick red seastar, individuals also occur in purple, orange and multicoloured combinations of these colours.

References

Oreasteridae
Monotypic echinoderm genera
Asteroidea genera
Taxa named by Ludwig Heinrich Philipp Döderlein